D56 runs parallel to a segment of A1 motorway between Zadar and Split areas. Furthermore the road has junctions to major state roads, namely D27 in Benkovac, connecting to D1 state road in Gračac, serving as a possible bypass of both Maslenica bridges, D424, D59 and D33 state roads. The road also connects to A1 motorway Skradin and Zadar 2 interchanges via D424 and a short connector road, respectively.

The D56 road also serves as a connection to Krka National Park.

The road, as well as all other state roads in Croatia, is managed and maintained by Hrvatske ceste, a state-owned company.

Traffic volume 

Traffic is regularly counted and reported by Hrvatske ceste, operator of the road. Substantial variations between annual (AADT) and summer (ASDT) traffic volumes are attributed to the fact that the road serves as a connection to A1 motorway and it carries substantial tourist traffic.

Road junctions and populated areas

See also
 Hrvatske autoceste
 Krka National Park

Sources

D056
D056
D056
D056